Roberto Brambilla (born 30 October 1975) is an Italian composer of contemporary classical music.

Life 

Brambilla was born in Livorno, Italy, and studied music at the "Conservatorio G. Verdi" in Milan with Alessandro Solbiati. He has improved his studies in different international masterclass given by Sir Peter Maxwell Davies, Alessandro Melchiorre, Alessandro Solbiati and Alvise Vidolin. His works has been performed at notable festivals in Italy, Austria, Belgium, Bulgaria, Canada, Denmark, Estonia, France, Germany, Greece, England, Holland, Poland, Portugal, Spain, Switzerland and USA by important performers, and are broadcast on RAI and in many other radio. He is published by BAM International, TEM and Warner/Chappell Music.

About the music 

The musical aesthetics of Roberto Brambilla underlines a research of sound materials, also using electronic tools, such as to highlight micro-sound in the "moment form". Examples are the glove created to modify the sounds of the piano in his piece Memoriam VII, for female voice and piano, or the use of modern instruments, used with the purpose to modify the timbre of classical instruments, in various works of his repertoire.

Awards 

 2004 Mario Nascimbene award
 2014 International PAS

Honors 

 Cavaliere Ordine al Merito della Repubblica Italiana (2019) for artistic merits

Works 
Selected works include:

 Cardinal Events for B clarinet (2006) 
Ipnagogico for ensemble (2006)
Toy Box for violin (2008)
 Paesaggi contaminati for piano four hands, electronic music and the painting "Paesaggi contaminati" by Emanuele Gregolin (2017)
 Déjà entendu for piano (2013)
 Collector et Medicus for choir (2014)
 Singer's murder for percussion (2013)
 Una ripresa dal castello for flute – Bass flute and cello (2007)
 Haurietis Aquas for organ (2018)
 Brise Marine for dramatic soprano and piano (2016)
 Pater Noster for soprano, alto, tenor and bass (2014)
 L'impronta di una foglia for piano four hands (2016)
 Sul profilo delle onde for a percussionist (2013)
 Clouds don't care if we fly higher for ensemble (2014)
Memoriam VII for female voice and piano (2010)
 Memoriam for large orchestra (2012)
 Dita nël lago for violin and electric guitar (2014)
No Black No Fashion for piano (2017)
 Eèa for B clarinet – Bass clarinet and piano (2015)

Discography 
Selected recordings include:
 Memoriam on Nuova contemporanea
Il carillon di Anjezë on BAM international
Farewell to Airon on BAM international
No Black No Fashion on BAM international

References

External links 

TEM – Taukay Edizioni Musicali
 BAM international
 Warner/Chappell

1975 births
Italian classical composers
Italian male classical composers
Milan Conservatory alumni
People from Livorno
20th-century classical composers
20th-century Italian composers
Living people
20th-century Italian male musicians